Henry Jost may refer to:

 Henry L. Jost (1873–1950), U.S. congressman
 Henry S. Jost (1804–1889), merchant and political figure in Nova Scotia